Streptomyces cheonanensis is a bacterium species from the genus of Streptomyces which has been isolated from radish growing soil in Cheonan in Korea.

See also 
 List of Streptomyces species

References

Further reading

External links
Type strain of Streptomyces cheonanensis at BacDive -  the Bacterial Diversity Metadatabase

cheonanensis
Bacteria described in 2006